Dabra is  town and a municipality in Gwalior district in the state of Madhya Pradesh, India located near NH-44 national highway. It serves the headquarters for both a tehsil and a coterminous community development block.

Dabra was also known as Padmapawaya in ancient times. Great poet Bhavabhuti had received his education at Dabra (ancient time Padmapawaya). Dabra has a sugar-producing factory and is almost equidistant from New Delhi and Bhopal. It is connected to New Delhi, Mumbai, Bhopal, Agra, Mathura, Varanasi, Kanpur, Lucknow, Haridwar, Chhapra, Gaya, Pune, Nasik, Jammu, Amritsar, Nagpur, Raigarh, Amritsar, Nanded Sahib, Allahabad, Ferozpur, Chhindwara, Udaipur, Jaipur, Ajmer, Puri, Indore, Jabalpur, Sagar and Bhubaneshwar through rail network. It is the biggest municipality in Madhya Pradesh as of now and naturally very beautiful. One of the nine jewels of Akbar Abdul Fazal (on the behest of Jahangir by Vir Singh Deo, the raja of Orchha) was killed and has a tomb near Aantri village ( from Dabra towards Gwalior). Van Khandeshwar Mahadev Temple ( from Dabra towards Gwalior), Kale Baba Temple, Gayatri Temple and Thakur Baba Temple are other famous temples in or nearby Dabra. Annual fair held at Thakur Baba temple is very famous locally. Natives of Dabra are known for their politeness, truthfulness and amiability. Dabra city is also known for cascading landscape; in addition to its massive production of 'Dhaan' (Rice grain with chaff). Unity in diversity is one of the unique character of this town. Discrimination based on religion, region, language, caste, gender and education is rarely found in Dabra. In any festival, natives of Dabra participate in such a harmonious way, it can even be showcased as an example of national integration.New temple built name as Lakshmi Narayan mandir near sugar mile.

Education 
Dabra has schools for primary and secondary education (affiliated with CBSE/ICSE/MP Boards). Some important CBSE and  MP-board Schools of the area include RASS-JB Public School,IPS kids school, Cambridge School, IIPS, Ira World School, GIPS and ICSE like St. Peter's. Apart from this, some of the notable institutes are Mangla Higher Secondary School, Daisy moral high Secondary school, Sant Kanwar Ram Higher Secondary School, Kidzee Preschool (a zee network school), Shining Scholars Public School, Daisy Moral Higher Secondary School, Dream India school, The Sangmaa School, Shri Guru Nanak Public Higher Secondary School, Nava Kanthi School, Government Boys Higher Secondary School, Saraswati Shishu Mandir, Government Girls Higher Secondary School, Deeksha Public School, D.A.V. Higher Secondary School, Vankhandeshwar Higher Secondary School, Dabra glory public school, Shri Ram school, ShriRam Bal Vihar, St. Peter's School, Vandematram Foundation School, Sanskar Public School, Mahatma Jyotirao Fooley Convent School, Balaji Public School, Bal Shrmik Vishesh Vidyalaya, Cambridge School, Global Public School, Maa Pitambra public school,  IPS (Adarsh) High Secondary School Dabra, India International Public School, Sangama School, Saraswati Children Convent Higher Secondary School Chhimak, etc.

Dabra has also a polytechnic college for technical education and a government college for non-technical higher education named Vrindasahaye Government College and many private institutes.

Medical facilities 
Dabra has a 100-bed Government Civil hospital and various private hospitals to serve health-related issues. SRM Multispeciality Hospital,
Ketkar hospital, Jagdeesh hospital merged with apollo spectra multispeciality is a leading hospital in providing medical facilities in Dabra.

Social work activities 
Non Government Organizations such as Nirmal Chaaya Women Welfare Organization work in Dabra to uplift the unprivileged people. These NGOs are helping educate poor children through child development and welfare programs, scholarships to the needy children; provide basic necessary clothing, school supplies like uniforms, books and stationery, etc. They also provide support alongside of the government programs to help pregnant women, old and helpless citizens.

Transportation

Railways 

Dabra Railway Station is a railway station in Gwalior district, Madhya Pradesh. Its station code is DBA. It serves around 2 lakh people of Dabra city, Bhitarwar, Tekanpur BSF Academy and many other nearby villages. The station consists of three platforms. The platforms are well sheltered. It has basic facilities of drinking water, sanitation and snacks. With almost 56 trains making halts, it has hood connectivity to both North and South India. This railway station operated by Jhansi Railway Station. Some major halting trains are Malwa Express, Lashkar Express, Chattishgarh Express, Gondwana Express, Udaipur-Khajuraho Express and 51 others. Dabra railway station has facilities like wheelchair, rest room, coach display boards, canteen, etc.

Roads 
Dabra is connected to Gwalior and Jhansi via NH-44. This is a four-lane highway that connects major cities like Gwalior, Jhansi, Chhatarpur, Khajuraho, Panna, Satna, Rewa and so on.

The city has regular bus services to Indore, Jaipur, Bhopal, Ujjain, Agra, Kanpur, Shivpuri, etc.

Dabra has local city transport in the form of Auto Rickshaws, Tata Magic and Electric Vehicle (TumTum)

Airport 
This airport serves to Bangalore, Indore, New Delhi, Mumbai, Jammu, Hyderabad, Jaipur, Pune, Patna, Chennai, Manglore, Ahemdabad, Kochi.

Food 
This place is known for its authentic sugarcane juice and tasty food. Dabra has a locality called , near the railway station where many fast food vendors serve delicious food. Few are Tirupati Balaji Fast Food & Dosa, Chintu Mastana Fast Food, kamal Chuski Bhandar, Jaish Food Cafe, Shitla Momos and many others. Dabra also have restaurants like Krishna's, Kwality Restaurant, The ND Grande, Jain Bhojnalay, Hotel Amar Basera, etc known for its delicious food. Samosas from Kallu Chaat, Sonu Foods, Anand Chaat, Guru Samosa are known for its authentic and delicious samosa. There are many sweet vendors like Jodhpur Misthan, Lakhmi Chand, Raju Misthan Bhandar and others who serves quality sweets.

This place has Zomato available to order food online.

Accommodation 
Dabra city has some great hotels to accommodate like The Sangama Estate, ND Grande, Suraj Hotel, Gautam Palace, Girraj Palace and others.

Geography 
It has an average elevation of 201 metres (659 feet).

Demographics 

As of the 2011 Census of India, Dabra had a population of 2,37,974. Males constitute 54% of the population and females 46%. Dabra has an average literacy rate of 57% : male literacy is 67% and, female literacy is 46%. In Dabra, 15% of the population is under 6 years of age.

Villages 
Dabra tehsil/block has 155 villages in addition to the census towns of Dabra, Buzurg, Ramgarh, and Tekanpur. The villages are listed below:

Transport 
The nearest airport is Gwalior.

References 

Cities and towns in Gwalior district